Barbara Massey Reece (born December 22, 1942) is an American politician who served in the Georgia House of Representatives from the 11th district from 1999 to 2013.

References

1942 births
Living people
Democratic Party members of the Georgia House of Representatives
20th-century American politicians
20th-century American women politicians
21st-century American politicians
21st-century American women politicians